MacLeòid or MhicLeòid (in the genitive case) is a masculine surname in Scottish Gaelic. The name translates into English as "son of Leòd". The feminine form of MhicLeòid is NicLeòid, which translates into English as "daughter of Leòd". These surnames originated as a patronyms. However, they no longer refer to the actual name of the bearer's father. There are numerous Anglicised forms of MacLeòid.

Etymology
The Scottish Gaelic MacLeòid originated as a patronym, in the form of mac Leòid, which translates into English as "son of Leòd". Today, however, the surname MacLeòid does not refer to the actual name of the bearer's father. The name Leòd is a Scottish Gaelic derivative of the Old Norse personal name Ljótr. This Old Norse personal name is composed of an element which translates into English as "ugly".

Feminine form
MacLeòid is a masculine surname. The Scottish Gaelic form of this surname for females is NicLeòid. This feminine name is composed of the prefix Nic- which is an abbreviated form of the Scottish Gaelic nighean which translates into English as "daughter". Like the masculine form of the surname, NicLeòid no longer refers to the actual name of the bearer's father.

Anglicised forms
Anglicised forms of MacLeòid, in use today, include MacLeod, McCloud, McLeod, McLoud. Anglicised forms of Mac Leóid include MacLeod, MacCleod, and MacCloud. According to late 19th-century Irish genealogist John O'Hart, the English MacLeod is also an Anglicised form of the Irish Mac Giolla Mochadha, which is etymologically unrelated to MacLeòid and Mac Leóid.

Families
An early record of the surname is of Gillandres MacLeod, in 1227. Gillandres was likely a member of a noted clerical family that descended from Leod, a 12th-century 'abbot' of Brechin. The surname MacLeòid, and its various Anglicised forms, have also been borne by members of Clan MacLeod, a once powerful Scottish clan, seated on the west coast of Scotland. The leading branches of the clan are the MacLeods of MacLeod. who are seated on Skye; and the MacLeods of Lewis, who were historically seated on Lewis. The MacLeods of Clan MacLeod derive their surname from Leod, a shadowy figure who does not appear in contemporary records, but is thought to have lived in the 13th century. The first members of the family to appear in contemporary records are Malcolm MacLeod and Torquil MacLeod, who are recorded in a royal charter in about the year 1343.

Notes

References

Clan Macleod
Scottish Gaelic masculine surnames
Scottish surnames
Patronymic surnames